Adam Forsyth (born 31 March 1981 in Kawerau, New Zealand) is an Australian amateur boxer who competed at the 2004 Olympics in the men's heavyweight division. He was an Australian Institute of Sport scholarship holder.

At 2004 Athens Olympics he beat Vedran Đipalo but lost highly controversially to Mohamed Elsayed. He has a national rival in Bradley Michael Pitt who edged him out in the 2008 Olympic qualifier.

References

External links

Olympics, data
sports-reference
BoxRec

Heavyweight boxers
1981 births
Living people
Boxers at the 2004 Summer Olympics
Olympic boxers of Australia
Australian Institute of Sport boxers
Australian male boxers
People from Kawerau